John Henry Richardson (born 11 July 1937) is a retired Church of England bishop. From 1994 to 2002, he was Bishop of Bedford (a suffragan bishop in the Diocese of St Albans, now serving in retirement as an honorary assistant bishop in the Dioceses of Carlisle and of Newcastle.

Early life
Richardson was born the son of John Richardson, sometime Archdeacon of Derby. Like his father, he was educated at Winchester and Trinity Hall, Cambridge, gaining the degree of Cambridge Master of Arts (MA Cantab).

Priest
He was made a deacon on Trinity Sunday 1963 (9 June) and ordained a priest the Trinity Sunday following (24 May 1964), both times by Michael Gresford Jones, Bishop of St Albans, at St Albans Cathedral. Richardson began his ministry with curacies in Stevenage and Eastbourne. He became Vicar of Chipperfield, then Rural Dean of Rickmansworth and finally, before his appointment to the episcopate, Vicar of St Michael's, Bishops Stortford.

Bishop
He was consecrated a bishop on 23 February 1994, by George Carey, Archbishop of Canterbury, at Westminster Abbey. Richardson served as the Bishop of Bedford, a suffragan bishop in the Diocese of St Albans. He retired in 2002, but has since served the church in retirement as an honorary assistant bishop elsewhere.

Family

In 1963, John Richardson married Felicity-Anne. They have three daughters and are grandparents to 7 grandchildren and have one great grandchild.

Later life
In retirement, Richardson continues to serve the Church, as an honorary assistant bishop in the Dioceses of Carlisle and of Newcastle.

References

 

1937 births
People educated at Winchester College
Alumni of Trinity Hall, Cambridge
Bishops of Bedford
20th-century Church of England bishops
21st-century Church of England bishops
Living people